A list of science fiction films released in the 1980s. These films include core elements of science fiction, but can cross into other genres. They have been released to a cinema audience by the commercial film industry and are widely distributed with reviews by reputable critics.

Collectively, the science fiction films from the 1980s have received 14 Academy Awards, 11 Saturn Awards, six Hugo Awards, five BAFTA awards, four BSFA Awards, and one Golden Globe Award. Four of these movies were the highest-grossing films of their respective years of release. However, these films also received nine Golden Raspberry Awards.

List

See also
 History of science fiction films

Notes

References

1980s
Lists of 1980s films by genre